Oraville is an unincorporated community in St. Mary's County, Maryland, United States.

The name Oraville is believed to be named after a girl named Ora Hopkins. Her stepfather, Nicholas S Hopkins, ran a millinery store in the early 1900s which was also a post office on the corner of Morganza Turner Rd and Route 235. The house still stands but is in ruins.

References

Unincorporated communities in St. Mary's County, Maryland
Unincorporated communities in Maryland